Ìlá Òràngún (or Ila) is an ancient city in Osun State, Nigeria, that was capital of an ancient city-state of the same name in the Igbomina area of Yorubaland in south-western Nigeria. Ìlá Òràngún is the more populous sister-city (and sister-kingdom) of Òkè-Ìlá Òràngún, located about 7.5 miles (12 km) to the north-east. The latitude and longitude coordinates of Ila Orangun are 8.019116 and 4.901962 respectively. According to the information obtained from GeoNames geographical database, the population of Ila Orangun in Osun State, Nigeria is 179,192.

It is the headquarters of the Ila Local Government Area. In addition to Ila Orangun, the other towns and villages in Ila Local Government Area include Abalagemo, Aba Ododo, Ajaba, Alagbede, Ayetoro Obaaro, Edemosi, Ejigbo-Orangun, Gaa Fulani, Oyi Ayegunle and so on.

The people of Ila speak the distinctive dialect of the Yoruba language called Igbomina (or Igbonna). A common traditional profession of the indigenes of the town is palm-wine tapping. This profession is referenced in one of the most popular songs and common sayings about the town of Ila. The proverb  means "Ila has no special medicine or magical preparations other than palm-wine". A folk song also says , which translates into English as "I am a citizen of Ila, my profession is very easy; if I am on top of a palm tree, I feel like I am upstairs in a multi-storey building." 

Ila-Orangun is the home of the Oyo (now Osun) State College of Education. The African Heritage Research Library was established in 1988.

The ancient town also has a Police Mobile Training School
The name of present king (Oba) of Ila Orangun is Oba Abdul Wahab Olukayode Oyedotun Bibiire I. Amongst the prominent clergy men (Muslim) in the town are Alhaji Jamiu Keuyemi, Alhaji Imam Hammed Solahudeen.

Prominent Ila Orangun indigenes include Alhaji Adebisi Akande, Former Osun state Governor, Tafa Balogun, former IGP Nigeria,Group Captain Atolagbe Adediji Pioneer Nigerian Airforce spokesman,Aisha Olajide amongst others. Among the town's prominent sons are chief Bisi Akande, former Governor of Osun State during the first tenure of chief Olusegun Obasanjo, Tafa Balogun, former Inspector General of the Nigerian Police Force, and many professionals in science, the arts, and academia.

There are more than 197 compounds in the ancient town.

References

Populated places in Osun State
 
Towns in Yorubaland